Heme arginate (or haem arginate) is a compound of heme and arginine used in the treatment of acute porphyrias. This heme product is only available outside the United States and is equivalent to hematin.

Heme arginate is a heme compound, whereby L-arginine is added to prevent rapid degradation. It is given intravenously, and its action of mechanism is to reduce the overproduction of δ-aminolevulinic acid, which can cause the acute symptoms in an attack of the acute porphyrias.

See also
 Acute intermittent porphyria
 Aminolevulinic acid
 Inborn error of metabolism

References 

Porphyrins